The Roman Catholic Diocese of Vacaria is a diocese located in the city of Vacaria in the Ecclesiastical province of Passo Fundo in Brazil.

History
 8 September 1934: Established as Territorial Prelature of Vacaria from the Metropolitan Archdiocese of Porto Alegre
 18 January 1957: Promoted as Diocese of Vacaria

Bishops

Ordinaries, in reverse chronological order
 Bishops of Vacaria (Roman rite), below
 Bishop Silvio Guterres Dutra (2018.05.09 - present)
 Bishop Irineu Gassen, O.F.M. (2008.05.28 – 2018.05.09)
 Bishop Pedro Sbalchiero Neto, M.S. (2003.11.12 – 2007.07.03)
 Bishop Orlando Octacílio Dotti, O.F.M. Cap. (1986.02.05 – 2003.11.12)
 Bishop Henrique Gelain (1964.03.28 – 1986.02.05)
 Bishop Augusto Petró (1958.05.16 – 1964.03.12), appointed Bishop of Uruguaiana, Rio Grande do Sul
 Prelate of Vacaria (Roman Rite), below
 Bishop Cândido Julio Bampi, O.F.M. Cap. (1936.06.27 – 1957.01.18), appointed Auxiliary Bishop of Caxias do Sul, Rio Grande do Sul

Coadjutor bishops
Orlando Octacílio Dotti, O.F.M. Cap. (1983-1986)
Pedro Sbalchiero Neto, M.S. (2003)

References
 GCatholic.org
 Catholic Hierarchy

Roman Catholic dioceses in Brazil
Christian organizations established in 1934
Vacaria, Roman Catholic Diocese of
Roman Catholic dioceses and prelatures established in the 20th century